Sapromyza oestrachion is a species of small flies of the family Lauxaniidae.

References 

Lauxaniidae
Insects described in 1868